Burner is a studio album by American hip hop producer Odd Nosdam. It was released on Anticon in 2005. "Untitled Three" was released as a single from the album. The album peaked at number 7 on the Dusted Top 40 Radio Chart.

Critical reception

At Metacritic, which assigns a weighted average score out of 100 to reviews from mainstream critics, the album received an average score of 81, based on 9 reviews, indicating "universal acclaim".

Brian Howe of Pitchfork gave the album a 7.0 out of 10, describing it as "a digest of field recordings, Moog synths, staticky samples, and scattershot drums, all waxing and waning around immovable slabs of buzzing bass." He added: "It splits the difference between the eschatological IDM of Boards of Canada's Geogaddi and Keith Fullerton Whitman's coruscating dronescapes."

Jordan Harper of Riverfront Times listed it as the most overlooked album of 2005.

Track listing

Personnel
Credits adapted from liner notes.

 Odd Nosdam – production, recording, mixing, photography, artwork
 Liz Hodson – vocals (1, 8), front cover collage
 Bomarr – sampler (1)
 Martin Dosh – Rhodes piano (2), drums (2), percussion (2), noise (2)
 Andrew Broder – guitar (4), keyboards (4), loop (4)
 Örvar Þóreyjarson Smárason – melodica (4)
 Dax Pierson – keyboards (5)
 Mike Patton – vocals (6, 7), keyboards (6, 7), noise (6, 7)
 Dee Kesler – violin (6, 7), noise (6, 7)
 Jessica Bailiff – guitar (6, 7, 12), vocals (9), percussion (9)
 Doug McDiarmid – guitar (6, 7), keyboards (6, 7)
 Josiah Wolf – bass guitar (6, 7), drums (6, 7)
 Jel – drum programming (6, 7)
 Jesse Edwards – guitar (9, 12), recorder (9)
 George Horn – mastering

References

External links
 

2005 albums
Odd Nosdam albums
Anticon albums